Emiel Dorst (25 December 1970) is a former Dutch footballer who played as a midfielder. He was born in Oosterland. After professional football, Dorst worked as a boat carpenter and furniture maker.

Club career 
Dorst started playing at SV Duiveland and at VV Kloetinge, playing in higher leagues, he reached the first team. He next played at VV Zierikzee.

In 1990 Dorst turned professional at VC Vlissingen. The next season the financially struggling professional team continued as VCV Zeeland and eventually discontinued. Dorst continued in 1992 to NAC Breda where he played in the first and second squad. In 1993 Dorst transferred to Tubantia Borgerhout in Belgium. He left this club in 1995 to play for RBC Roosendaal in the Eerste Divisie. Starting December 1999 he played in TOP Oss, also in the Eerste Divisie.

In 2000, Dorst returned to Kloetinge and in 2006 he made his last transfer to Bruse Boys.

Family
In 2018, Emiel's son Yarick Dorst joined BVV Barendrecht in the Tweede Divisie. Yarick relegated with BVV to the Derde Divisie, then transferred to neighboring ASWH in the Tweede.

References 

1970 births
Living people
Dutch carpenters
Dutch footballers
Footballers from Schouwen-Duiveland
VV Kloetinge players
NAC Breda players
VC Vlissingen players
TOP Oss players
RBC Roosendaal players
Association footballers not categorized by position